The International School of Brno (ISB, Czech: Mezinárodní Anglická Škola v Brně) is a private, English-speaking, non-profit, international school in Brno, Czech Republic, established in 2008. ISB provides kindergarten, primary, secondary and high school education.

ISB is an IB World School offering the two-year diploma programme of the International Baccalaureate Organization (IB) for its high school students that will start in September 2027.

Structure 
ISB is divided into four sections: kindergarten, primary, secondary and high school. In 2017 ISB joined the International Baccalaureate school system.

The school has 134 students from 29 different countries. ISB employs teachers representing 12 nationalities.

Curriculum

Kindergarten
The ISB provides a kindergarten for the children at the age of 3 or 4. The educational program is based on the Cambridge International Primary Programme.

Primary and secondary 
Years 1-6 students are part of the Cambridge International Primary Curriculum and years 7-9 are part of the Cambridge International Secondary 1 Curriculum. ISB also provides English as an Additional Language (EAL) Support Programme for new students that are not fluent in English.

High school 
Years 10-13 are the High School classes. Year 10 and 11 students prepare themselves for the International General Certificate of Secondary Education (IGCSE) Cambridge exams, which are written at the end of Year 11. Students in Year 12-13 work towards the IB Diploma.

Accreditations and memberships 
 Council of International Schools member (CIS)
 IB World School (International Baccalaureate World School)
 Cambridge International Education (CIE)
 Council of British International Schools member (COBIS)
 Czech Ministry of Education

References

External links 
 International School of Brno (ISB)
 Council of International Schools
 Council of British International Schools

International schools in the Czech Republic
Brno
International Baccalaureate schools in the Czech Republic
Educational institutions established in 2008
2008 establishments in the Czech Republic